Wadebridge Camels RFC is a rugby union club based in Wadebridge, Cornwall which has been in existence since 1955.  They play at Molesworth Field.

History

Wadebridge played in the Tribute South West 1 West, for four seasons having won promotion from the Tribute Western Counties West by beating Tribute Western Counties North runners-up Thornbury RFC by 25 points to 21 at the end of the 2009–10 season.  In what proved to be a very successful season for the Camels, Wadebridge followed up their promotion by winning the Skinners Cornwall Cup final for the second time in three years by beating defending champions St Ives by 26 points to 21. The Camels currently play in Tribute Western Counties West a level seven league in the English rugby union system.

2008–09 EDF Energy National Trophy
The Camels qualified for the competition by winning the Cornwall cup. The club was unfortunately knocked out in the third round by Tynedale.

Season summary

Honours
Cornwall Clubs Cup winners (6): 1972–73, 1975–76, 1976–77, 1977–78, 1992–93, 2000–01
Cornwall League 1 champions: 1988–89
Cornwall Cup winners (4): 2007–08, 2009–10, 2011–12, 2018–19
Cornwall 1 v Devon 1 promotion playoff winners: 2000–01
Tribute Western Counties (north v west) promotion playoff winners: 2009–10

England Counties Squad
 Zac Cinnamond – England Counties (U20) tour to Georgia, May 2013.

See also
 Cornish rugby

Notes

References

External links
 www.WadebridgeCamelsRFC.co.uk

Cornish rugby union teams
Rugby clubs established in 1955
Sports clubs in Cornwall
1955 establishments in England
Wadebridge